Micromus variegatus is a species of brown lacewing in the family Hemerobiidae. It is found in Europe and Northern Asia (excluding China) and North America.

References

Further reading

 

Hemerobiiformia
Articles created by Qbugbot
Insects described in 1793
Insects of Asia
Insects of Europe
Taxa named by Johan Christian Fabricius